Trix, the Romance of a Millionairess is a 1921 German silent romance film directed by Frederic Zelnik and starring Lya Mara, Ernst Hofmann, and Ilka Grüning. It premiered at the Marmorhaus in Berlin.

The film's sets were designed by the art director Fritz Lederer.

Cast
Lya Mara
Ernst Hofmann
Ilka Grüning
Wilhelm Diegelmann
Josefine Dora
Albert Patry
Johannes Riemann
Fritz Ruhbeck
Fritz Schulz
Herma van Delden
Vilma von Mayburg

References

External links

Films of the Weimar Republic
German silent feature films
Films directed by Frederic Zelnik
German black-and-white films
1920s German films